Rouglas José Odor (born January 26, 1968) is a Venezuelan professional baseball infielder and coach. Odor is the manager of the Akron RubberDucks, the Double-A affiliate of the Cleveland Guardians.

Career
Odor attended the University of New Orleans, and played college baseball for the New Orleans Privateers. In 1987, he played collegiate summer baseball with the Chatham A's of the Cape Cod Baseball League. He began his professional career in the Cleveland Indians organization for the Burlington Indians in 1988. He played for eight seasons in Minor League Baseball for the Indians and Milwaukee Brewers organizations, and in the Texas-Louisiana League in 1995.

From 1996 to 2001, Odor was the field coordinator of a Venezuelan academy run by the Indians. He became a hitting coach with the Akron RubberDucks. He managed the Burlington Indians from 2002 through 2004. He became the hitting coach of the Columbus Clippers in 2015. Odor joined the Venezuelan national baseball team as a coach in the 2017 World Baseball Classic. In the Venezuelan Professional Baseball League, he managed the Caribes de Anzoátegui during the 2017-18 season.

In 2018, Odor became the manager of the Lynchburg Hillcats. The next year, he managed the Akron RubberDucks.

Personal life
Odor is the uncle of Rougned Odor, who is currently a member of the Baltimore Orioles. Odor is also the uncle of Rougned Odor, who is Rougned Odor’s younger brother and a former minor league member in the Texas Rangers organization.

References

External links

Living people
1968 births
Sportspeople from Maracaibo
Venezuelan baseball players
Minor league baseball coaches
Minor league baseball managers
Baseball infielders
New Orleans Privateers baseball players
Chatham Anglers players
Burlington Indians players (1986–2006)
Kinston Indians players
Watertown Indians players
Canton-Akron Indians players
El Paso Diablos players
Laredo Apaches players
Lubbock Crickets players
Venezuelan baseball coaches